The 2018 French Athletics Championships was the 130th edition of the national championship in outdoor track and field for France. It was held on 6–8 July at Stadium Municipal d'Albi in Albi. It was the third time that the city hosted the competition, following previous editions in 2008 and 2011. A total of 38 events (divided evenly between the sexes) were contested over the three-day competition.

Carolle Zahi took a women's sprint double in the 100 metres and 200 metres. On the men's side, Renaud Lavillenie won his eighth outdoor pole vault national title. Several non-French national athletes competed as guests and their performances were excluded for the purposes of the French Championships.

Medal summary

Men

Women

References

Results
Les Championnats de France 2018 sur le site de la Fédération française d'athlétisme

French Athletics Championships
French Athletics Championships
French Athletics Championships
French Athletics Championships
Sport in Albi